1946 in sports describes the year's events in world sport. Although World War II had ended in 1945, a number of major sporting events were still precluded by planning difficulties, which the war had produced, the 1946 FIFA World Cup being perhaps the best known. However, the year is still notable as several sporting events resumed for the first time since the start of the war.

American football
 NFL Championship: the Chicago Bears won 24–14 over the New York Giants at the Polo Grounds
 All-America Football Conference begins play. Cleveland Browns win the championship by beating New York Yankees 14–9.
The San Francisco 49ers are established and the Cleveland Rams move to Los Angeles, becoming the first professional sports teams in California.
 Notre Dame Fighting Irish – college football national championship

Association football
International
 FIFA World Cup – not held due to World War II
Colombia
 Millonarios F.C. was founded in Teusaquillo area, Bogota on June 18.    
Spain
 La Liga – won by Sevilla
England
 FA Cup – Derby County beat Charlton Athletic 4–1 after extra time.
 The Football League resumes playing for the 1946–47 season.
Germany
 No major football is held due to the Allied occupation of Germany.
Italy
 Serie A-B – won by Torino
Portugal
 Primeira Liga – won by C.F. Os Belenenses
France
 French Division 1 – won by Lille OSC

Athletics
 The third European Athletics Championships held from August 22 to August 25 at the Bislett Stadion in Oslo. For the first time, it is a combined event for men and women; and for the first time a city in Scandinavia hosts the championships.

Australian rules football
 Victorian Football League
 Essendon wins the 50th VFL Premiership, defeating Melbourne 22.18 (150) to 13.9 (87) in the Grand Final.
 Brownlow Medal awarded to Don Cordner (Melbourne)
South Australian National Football League
 5 October: Norwood 13.14 (92) beat Port Adelaide 9.10 (64) for their twentieth premiership, and the first of ten for coach Jack Oatey.
Western Australian National Football League
 5 October: East Fremantle complete the only perfect season in open-age WANFL football by beating West Perth 11.13 (79) to 10.13 (73) in the Grand Final.

Baseball
 January 23 – Hall of Fame election – the writers' vote again fails to select an inductee, despite a newly revamped voting process. Voting again favors earlier candidates from the 1900s and 1910s, but none is able to gain 75% of the vote.
 Jackie Robinson plays for the Montreal Royals, the AAA affiliate of the Brooklyn Dodgers, becoming the first African-American to play in organised baseball in the 20th century. Vincent "Manny" McIntyre from Fredericton, New Brunswick, Canada becomes the first Black Canadian to sign a professional baseball contract (with the Sherbrooke Canadians).
 April 23 – the Hall of Fame Committee clears the deadlock at the top of the writers' ballot by selecting 11 new inductees, primarily from the popular candidates of the 1900s and 1910s: Jesse Burkett, Frank Chance, Jack Chesbro, Johnny Evers, Clark Griffith, Tommy McCarthy, Joe McGinnity, Eddie Plank, Joe Tinker, Rube Waddell and Ed Walsh. Selections of 19th century players are largely postponed. It is decided that the writers will henceforth select only players retired within the more recent past, rather than from the entire 20th century.
 June 15 – when some ballplayers jump to the Mexican League, MLB Commissioner Happy Chandler mentions a lifetime suspension for them, but his penalty is later reduced (1949).
 July 14 – player–manager Lou Boudreau of Cleveland Indians hits four doubles and one home run, but Ted Williams wallops three HRs and drives in eight runs, as the Boston Red Sox top the Indians 11–10. In the Sox second–game win, the famous "Boudreau Shift" is born. Boudreau shifts all his players, except the third baseman and left fielder, to the right side of the diamond in an effort to stop Williams, who grounds out and walks twice while ignoring the shift.
 World Series – St. Louis Cardinals defeat the Boston Red Sox 4 games to 3.
 Negro World Series – Newark Eagles defeat the Kansas City Monarchs, 4 games to 3.
 Venezuelan Professional Baseball League (Liga Venezolana de Béisbol Profesional) first official game held on January 12.

Basketball
NBL Championship
Rochester Royals win three games to none over the Sheboygan Redskins
Events
On June 6 the NBA is formed as the Basketball Association of America.  As a second major professional league, it unlike the NBL attempts to operate primarily in larger arenas and in major cities.
 Boston Celtics, a major National Basketball Association club was founded in Massachusetts, United States.
 Continental Basketball Association formed as the Eastern Pennsylvania Basketball League
 Fourth European basketball championship, Eurobasket 1946, is won by Czechoslovakia.
Slovenia (former part of Yugoslavia)
 KK Olimpija (Košarkarski Kulb Olimpija) was founded in Ljubljana, however this club was dissolution in 2019.

Cricket
 29 March: With the end of the war, Test cricket is played for the first time since August 1939, and Australia destroys New Zealand by an innings and 103 runs on a rain-affected pitch.
Australia
 Although first-class cricket was resumed after the lifting of bans on weekday sport in 1945–46, the Sheffield Shield was not awarded.
 Most runs – Sid Barnes 794 @ 88.22 (HS 200)
 Most wickets – George Tribe 40 @ 19.02 (BB 9–45)
England
 County Championship – won by Yorkshire
 Minor Counties Championship – won by Suffolk
 Most runs – Denis Compton 2,403 @ 61.61 (HS 235)
 Most wickets – Eric Hollies 184 @ 15.60 (BB 10–49)
 England defeat India one Test to nil with two draws
India
 Ranji Trophy – Holkar beat Baroda by 374 runs.
New Zealand
 Plunket Shield – won by Canterbury

Cycling
Tour de France
 not contested due to World War II
Giro d'Italia
 won by Gino Bartali

Figure skating
 The World Figure Skating Championships were not held due to World War II.

Golf
Men's professional
 Masters Tournament – Herman Keiser
 U.S. Open – Lloyd Mangrum
 British Open – Sam Snead
 PGA Championship – Ben Hogan
Men's amateur
 British Amateur – Jimmy Bruen
 U.S. Amateur – Ted Bishop
Women's professional
 Women's Western Open – Louise Suggs
 U.S. Women's Open – Patty Berg
 Titleholders Championship – Louise Suggs

Horse racing
Steeplechases
 Cheltenham Gold Cup – won by Prince Regent
 Grand National – won by Lovely Cottage
Hurdle races
 Champion Hurdle – won by Distel
Flat races
 Australia – Melbourne Cup won by Russia
 Canada – King's Plate won by Kingarvie
 France – Prix de l'Arc de Triomphe won by Caracalla
 Ireland – Irish Derby Stakes won by Bright News
 English Triple Crown Races:
 2,000 Guineas Stakes – Happy Knight
 The Derby – Airborne
 St. Leger Stakes – Airborne
 United States Triple Crown Races:
 Kentucky Derby – Assault
 Preakness Stakes – Assault
 Belmont Stakes – Assault

Ice hockey
 Stanley Cup – Montreal Canadiens beat Boston Bruins four games to one.
 A first game for Soviet Championship League, as predecessor of Kontinental Hockey League was held on December 22.

Motorsport

Rowing
The Boat Race
 30 March — Oxford wins the 92nd Oxford and Cambridge Boat Race

Rugby league
1945–46 European Rugby League Championship / 1946–47 European Rugby League Championship
1946 New Zealand rugby league season
1946 NSWRFL season
1945–46 Northern Rugby Football League season / 1946–47 Northern Rugby Football League season

Rugby union
 Five Nations Championship series is not contested due to World War II

Snooker
 World Snooker Championship – Joe Davis beats Horace Lindrum 78–67, then announces his retirement from the event after this, his fifteenth consecutive victory.

Speed skating
Speed Skating World Championships
 not contested due to World War II

Tennis
Australia
 Australian Men's Singles Championship – John Bromwich (Australia) defeats Dinny Pails (Australia) 5–7, 6–3, 7–5, 3–6, 6–2
 Australian Women's Singles Championship – Nancye Wynne Bolton (Australia) defeats Joyce Fitch (Australia) 6–4, 6–4
England
 Wimbledon Men's Singles Championship – Yvon Petra (France) defeats Geoff Brown (Australia) 6–2, 6–4, 7–9, 5–7, 6–4
 Wimbledon Women's Singles Championship – Pauline Betz Addie (USA) defeats Louise Brough Clapp (USA) 6–2, 6–4
France
 French Men's Singles Championship – Marcel Bernard (France) defeats Jaroslav Drobný (Czechoslovakia) 3–6, 2–6, 6–1, 6–4, 6–3
 French Women's Singles Championship – Margaret Osborne duPont (USA) defeats Pauline Betz Addie (USA) 1–6, 8–6, 7–5
USA
 American Men's Singles Championship – Jack Kramer (USA) defeats Tom Brown (USA) 9–7, 6–3, 6–0
 American Women's Singles Championship – Pauline Betz Addie (USA) defeats Doris Hart (USA) 11–9, 6–3
Davis Cup
 1946 Davis Cup –  5–0  at Kooyong Stadium (grass) Melbourne, Australia

Awards
 Associated Press Male Athlete of the Year – Glenn Davis, College football
 Associated Press Female Athlete of the Year – Babe Didrikson Zaharias, LPGA golf

Notes
Although Torino's scudetto is considered official, because Serie B teams from southern Italy played it is not usually included in statistics.
This is the first of only two instances where a team other than the "Big Three" has won the Primeira Liga.

References

 
Sports by year